Lincoln-Way East High School or LWE, is a four-year public high school located approximately three miles south of Interstate 80 near the intersection of Colorado Avenue, U.S. Route 45 (La Grange Road) and U.S. Route 30 (Lincoln Highway) in Frankfort, Illinois, a southwest suburb of Chicago, Illinois, in the United States. It is a part of Lincoln-Way Community High School District 210, which also includes Lincoln-Way Central High School and Lincoln-Way West High School and formerly Lincoln-Way North High School.

History 
In December 1974, voters approved a $4,985,000 bond issue to develop a new freshman–sophomore building on the Frankfort site. Construction began in the summer of 1975, and the school opened in the fall of 1977 as Lincoln-Way High School East Campus. In November 1992, voters agreed to double the size of the campus to accommodate growth. Facilities added included a 42 classroom academic wing, a field house and auditorium. The expansion was completed in March 1995.

In 1997, citizens of District  210 approved a $60 million building bond referendum to split the existing freshmen–sophomore / junior–senior configuration into two separate four-year high schools and to add to the existing East and Central Campuses.  The East Campus added 50 classrooms and an Olympic-sized swimming pool, while the Central Campus added 50 classrooms, an Olympic-sized swimming pool, a performing arts auditorium with music classrooms, new nursing office, and new administrative offices (PPS).  The splitting of Lincoln-Way into two separate high schools became official for the 2001–02 school year as the East Campus became Lincoln-Way East High School.

Academics 
, Lincoln-Way East is considered an "exemplary" school, with 1,070 students taking Advanced Placement or dual credit courses, a 97.0% four-year graduation rate (98.3% five-year rate) and 90.6% of students going on to postsecondary education.

Athletics 
The Athletic Director is Mark Vander Kooi and the Asst. Athletic Director is Elizabeth Hyland.

Lincoln-Way East competes as a member of the Southwest Suburban Conference. The school is a member of the Illinois High School Association (IHSA), which governs most athletics and competitive activities in Illinois. School colors are Blue and Black. Teams are called the "Griffins".

Lincoln-Way East sponsors interscholastic teams for young men and women in basketball, bowling, cross country, golf, gymnastics, soccer, swimming, tennis, track and field, volleyball, and water polo. Young women may compete in badminton, cheerleading, dance, and softball, while young men may also compete in baseball, football, and wrestling.

The following teams have won or finished in the top four of their respective IHSA sponsored state championship tournament or meet: 

 Badminton (Girls): Sectional Champions (2004-05, 2017-18, 2020-21, 2021-22)
 Basketball (Girls): Regional Champions (2002-03, 2007-08, 2008-09, 2009-10, 2010-11, 2011-12, 2013-14, 2015-16, 2017-18)
 Bowling (Boys): 3rd Place (2006-07)
 Cheerleading: State Champions (2013-14, 2014-15, 2016-17, 2018-19, 2019-20, 2020-21, 2022-23)
 Cross Country (Boys): Regional Champions (2011-12, 2017-18)
 Cross Country (Girls): 2nd Place (2004-05); Regional Champions (2006-07)
 Football: State Champions (2005-06, 2017-18, 2019-20); 2nd Place (2012-13, 2022-23)
 Gymnastics (Boys): State Champions (2005-06, 2010-11); 2nd Place (2004-05, 2007-08, 2008-09, 2009-10, 2011-12) 
 Golf (Girls): Regional Champions (2007-08, 2008-09, 2013-14, 2020-21, 2021-22)
 Softball: State Champions (2001-02); 2nd Place (2014-15, 2016-17); 4th place (2013-14) 
 Swimming (Boys): Sectional Champions (2004-05, 2005-06, 2006-07, 2007-08, 2008-09, 2010-11, 2014-15, 2015-16, 2016-17, 2017-18, 2018-19, 2021-22)
 Swimming (Girls): Sectional Champions (2004-05, 20007-08, 2008-09, 2009-10, 2010-11, 2011-12, 2013-14, 2014-15, 2015-16, 2016-17, 2017-18, 2019-20)
 Tennis (Boys): Sectional Champions (2002-03, 2005-06, 2006-07, 2007-08, 2008-09, 2009-10, 2010-11, 2012-13, 2013-14, 2014-15, 2015-16, 2016-17, 2017-18, 2020-21, 2021-22)
 Track (Boys): Sectional Champions (2006-07, 2007-08)
 Track (Girls): State Champions (2012-13, 2013-14, 2014-15, 2015-16, 2020-21); 2nd Place (2010-11) 
 Volleyball (Boys): State Champions (2013-14, 2017-18); 2nd Place (2016-17, 2021-22); 4th Place (2006-07, 2020-21)  
 Water Polo (Boys): 4th Place (2018-19, 2020-21)
 Wrestling: Regional Champions (2003-04, 2004-05, 2005-06, 2006-07)

Notable alumni
 Nick Allegretti – NFL guard for the Kansas City Chiefs; Super Bowl LIV champion 
 Dietrich Enns – Former MLB Pitcher, NPB pitcher for the Seibu Lions
 Adam Gettis – Former NFL guard
 A. J. Henning – College football player for the Michigan Wolverines
 Alex Storako – Softball player

 Erika Lauren Wasilewski - Reality TV participant, radio personality

References

External links 
 

Public high schools in Illinois
Schools in Will County, Illinois